The Australian Federation Party (AFP), formerly known as the Country Alliance and the Australian Country Party, is an Australian political party. Founded in 2004 by four rural Victorians, the party lodged its initial registration with the Victorian Electoral Commission on 15 August 2005.

In 2020, the party changed its name to the Australian Federation Party, and is currently registered to contest elections in New South Wales, Tasmania, the Australian Capital Territory, and the Northern Territory  as well as at federal elections.

History
The party was founded in early 2004 as the Country Alliance by four Victorians—Fiona Hilton-Wood, a staffer for independent MP Russell Savage; Russell Bate, a Shire of Mansfield councillor; Bob Richardson, a former union official; and Russell Pearson, a member of the Sporting Shooters Association. As the Country Alliance, the party contested the 2006 and 2010 Victorian state elections. In July 2011, the Country Alliance was registered with the Australian Electoral Commission (AEC).

In August 2015, the Victorian Electoral Commission (VEC) approved a name change for the party, adopting the name Australian Country Party. In October 2015, the Australian Electoral Commission approved the party's name change for federal elections.

In August 2018, the party lodged a change of name application to change its name to the Australia Party/Give it Back, but withdrew the application before processing was completed. In September 2018, the VEC approved a similar application, with the party registered in Victoria as the Australian Country Party/Give It Back. In January 2019, the party applied to revert its Victorian registration to the Australian Country Party.

In February 2020, the party changed its name to the Australian Federation Party. On 4 March, Tasmanians 4 Tasmania, a minor party which had contested the 2018 Tasmanian state election, was formally renamed to Federation Party Tasmania.

On 30 June 2020, the application to register Federation Party Australian Capital Territory was lodged with the ACT Electoral Commission. The party is one of 16 parties registered to contest the 2020 Australian Capital Territory general election. The party has also applied to contest local government elections in New South Wales.

On Friday, 22 April 2022, the Australian Electoral Commission Declaration of Candidates across Australia confirmed that the Australian Federation Party is contesting 61 House of Representative seats. This is more seats in their first Federal Election Campaign than One Nation contested at the 2019 election

On Friday, 1 July 2022, the Australian Electoral Commission made the final update of the 2022 Federal Election results for First Preference Votes by a Registered Party. The Australian Federation Party polled the eighth highest Primary vote of any of the 31 registered Parties in Australia. This is based on combining the Coalition's 4 brands of Liberal/Liberal National Party of Queensland/The Nationals/Country Liberal Party (NT).

Electoral results

Federal
As the Country Alliance, the party contested the 2013 Australian federal election in several Victorian lower house seats, as well as fielding Senate candidates in South Australia, Tasmania and Victoria. The party received 6,440 votes, 0.05% of all votes cast.

The Australian Country Party fielded two Senate candidates and three candidates for seats in the House of Representatives, all in Victoria, in the 2016 federal election.

As the Australian Federation Party, the party contested the 2020 Eden-Monaro by-election. Candidate Jason Potter finished in 14th place out of 14 candidates with 170 votes, or 0.18% of votes cast.

The final 2022 Federal Election results for First Preference Votes by a Registered Party, published by the Australian Electoral Commission, showed that the Australian Federation Party polled the eighth highest Primary vote of any of the 31 registered Parties in Australia. This is based on combining the Coalition's 4 brands of Liberal/Liberal National Party of Queensland/The Nationals/Country Liberal Party (NT).

Victoria
As the Country Alliance, the party contested the three rural upper house regions in the 2006 state election, receiving 13,329 first preference votes and finishing in 9th place overall. In the Western Victoria Region, preferences from the Country Alliance and the Labor Party flowed to the Democratic Labour Party's lead candidate Peter Kavanagh, resulting in Kavanagh securing the fifth and final seat, defeating Greens candidate Marcus Ward.

The party nominated 37 candidates for the 2010 state election, standing in four upper house seats—Western Victoria, Eastern Victoria, Northern Victoria and Northern Metropolitan—and most of the lower house seats in regional Victoria. At the election, the party's best result in the lower house was in the district of Shepparton where it polled 20.5% of the primary vote and 39.8% of the two-candidate preferred vote after preferences. In the Legislative Council, the party was in contention for the final spot in the three country regions. In Northern Victoria Region, Country Alliance polled 6.8% of the primary vote and fell short by approximately 1,900 votes on the final count after the distribution of preferences.

In February 2014, the Victorian branch of Katter's Australian Party merged with Country Alliance, announcing the newly combined party would contest the 2014 state election as the Australian Country Alliance. At the election, the Australian Country Alliance received 1.28% of the vote in the lower house and 0.68% in the upper house in the 2014 Victorian state election.

As Australian Country Party/Give It Back, the party contested two lower house seats—Ovens Valley and South-West Coast—as well as all eight upper house regions in the 2018 state election. Both lower house candidates received over 8% of first preference votes. It did not receive as much as 2% of first preference votes in any region for the upper house, with an average result of 0.68%.

Northern Territory
The party stood candidates in four seats at the 2020 Northern Territory general election: Araluen, Braitling, Gwoja and Namatjira. Kenny Lechleitner received 12.9% of the vote in Gwoja and Catherine Sartour received 9.5% of the vote in Namatjira. Overall, the party received a total of 942 first preference votes, or 0.92% of all votes cast.

Australian Capital Territory
The party stood three candidates in the October 2020 ACT Election. Jason Potter and Scott Sandford in Brindabella and Mohammad Hussain in Yerrabi.

Notes

References

External links
 

Political parties established in 2005
2005 establishments in Australia
Political parties in Australia
Agrarian parties in Australia
Agrarian parties
Christian political parties in Australia
Conservative parties in Australia